Benchi Express is a catamaran ferry operated by the Spanish-Norwegian shipping company Fred. Olsen Express for local transport connecting ports on the island of La Gomera (Canary Islands). It was delivered to Fred. Olsen in September 2017 and has been operating the route between the towns of San Sebastián de La Gomera, Playa Santiago and Valle Gran Rey since then. The ship was purpose-built for this route by Drassanes Dalmau, based in Arenys de Mar (Barcelona).

Design and construction
The Benchi Express is a passenger transport catamaran, purpose-built in Arenys de Mar by Drassanes Dalmau for Fred. Olsen Express. The construction is entirely of composite material.

The ship is powered by two Caterpillar C32 ACERT diesel engines capable of providing a combined power of 2,134 kW.

The Benchi Express can transport up to 250 passengers on two decks: the main deck has a capacity of 150 passengers while the upper open-air deck can hold another 100 passengers. The upper deck can be covered if required. There is also space for eight bicycles or motorcycles.

Predecessors
Fred. Olsen Express first operated the local La Gomera route connecting San Sebastián, Playa Santiago and Valle Gran Rey between 2009 and 2012 using another ferry, also called Benchi Express. The ferry also connected the island's capital, San Sebastián, to the town of Los Cristianos in Tenerife, thus serving as a sea link between the two islands.

References

External links 

 Benchi Express information from Drassanes Dalmau

Ferries of Spain
2017 ships
La Gomera
Individual catamarans
Transport in the Canary Islands